Julia Glushko and Alexandra Panova were the defending champions, but both players chose not to participate.

Kristie Ahn and Quinn Gleason won the title, defeating Laura Pigossi and Renata Zarazúa in the final, 6–3, 6–2.

Seeds

Draw

References
Main Draw

Revolution Technologies Pro Tennis Classic - Doubles